Robert Ball (born July 17, 1956) is a former Australian international lawn bowler.

He won a silver medal in the fours with Ian Taylor, Stephen Anderson and Steve Srhoy at the 1994 Commonwealth Games in Victoria.

References

1956 births
Australian male bowls players
Living people
Commonwealth Games medallists in lawn bowls
Commonwealth Games silver medallists for Australia
Bowls players at the 1994 Commonwealth Games
20th-century Australian people
Medallists at the 1994 Commonwealth Games